È sempre bello is the fifth studio album by Italian singer-songwriter Coez, released on 29 March 2019 by Carosello.

Track listing

Charts

References

2019 albums